The Symbolic Optimal Assembly Program (SOAP) is an assembler for the IBM 650 Magnetic Drum Data-Processing Machine, an early computer first used in 1954. It was developed by Stan Poley at the IBM Thomas J. Watson Research Center. SOAP is called Optimal (or Optimum) because it attempts to store generated instructions on the storage drum to minimize the access time from one instruction to the next. SOAP is a multi-pass assembler, that is, it processes the source program more than once in order to generate the object program.

The first version of SOAP was succeeded by SOAP II in 1957, which supported additional hardware features such as index registers and magnetic core memory, SOAP IIA in 1958, SOAP 2L, SOAP 2L Tape, SOAP 4000, and SOAP 42 in 1961. SOAP was used as a backend to the FOR TRANSIT compiler in 1957.

Donald Knuth independently produced versions named SOAP III in 1958 and SUPERSOAP in 1959 at Case Institute of Technology, now part of Case Western Reserve University in Cleveland, Ohio. The US National Bureau of Standards, under the direction of Herbert Howe, also wrote a version of SOAP, called ISOPAR, said to significantly improve optimization.

Optimization
The IBM 650 uses a magnetic drum as main storage. The drum holds up to 4,000 words and rotates at 12,500 revolutions per minute (RPM), 4.8 msec per rotation, or average access time of 2.4  msec. "If you placed your instructions sequentially onto the drum, you would have to wait for a complete rotation of the drum before the CPU could obtain the next instruction. Since many instructions on the 650 could execute in around 3 milliseconds, you would try to optimize your code by placing the instructions on the drum in such a way that it would not take the drum a full revolution to access your next instruction." Each instruction contains the address of the next instruction to execute; instead of a sequential array of instructions the memory appears to be a linked list. SOAP optimizes by placing instructions to be executed sequentially in locations around the drum such that the next instruction is available as soon as possible after the current instruction finishes. This optimization was said to make the assembled programs "run as much as six or seven times faster."

SOAP features

Pseudo-operations
SOAP II supports the following pseudo-operations (assembly directives):

Comments
Each source card can contain up to ten characters of comments in columns 63–72. For longer comments, up to thirty characters may be entered on a Comments Card (Type 1, '1' in column 41) in columns 43–72

References

External links
 SOAP at the Online Historical Encyclopaedia of Programming Languages

1955 software
Assemblers
IBM software
Assembly language software